Leónidas Plaza y Gutiérrez de Caviedes (18 April 1865 – 17 November 1932) was an Ecuadorian politician who was the President of Ecuador from 1 September 1901 to 31 August 1905 and again from 1 September 1912 to 31 August 1916.

He was the son of José Buenaventura Plaza, a school teacher and, Alegría Gutiérrez de Caviedes Sevillano, an attractive tall woman with aristocratic features and exquisite social manners of Colombian descendancy. He married María Avelina Lasso Ascázubi, with whom he had eight children. One of them, Galo Plaza, was also president of Ecuador. He was Presidents of the Chamber of Deputies in 1900. He was Minister of Finance in 1911.

References

External links

 Official Website of the Ecuadorian Government about the country President's History
 Rulers.org

1865 births
1932 deaths
People from Manabí Province
Ecuadorian people of Colombian descent
Ecuadorian Radical Liberal Party politicians
Presidents of Ecuador
Presidents of the Chamber of Deputies of Ecuador
Ecuadorian Ministers of Finance